Veli Arthur Helenius (5 October 1910 – 16 November 1984) was a Finnish diplomat and lawyer. 

Helenius was born and died in Helsinki. He was Chief Consul and Head of Commercial Representation in Cologne since 1958, Ambassador to New Delhi, Jakarta and Bangkok in 1961–1964, Head of the Administrative Department of the Ministry for Foreign Affairs 1964–1967, Ambassador to Beijing and Hanoi between 1967-1974 and Copenhagen 1974–1977.

References 

Ambassadors of Finland to India
Ambassadors of Finland to Indonesia
Ambassadors of Finland to Thailand
Ambassadors of Finland to China
Ambassadors of Finland to Vietnam
Ambassadors of Finland to Denmark
1910 births
1984 deaths
Diplomats from Helsinki